Central Tzoumerka is a municipality in the Arta regional unit, Epirus, Greece. The seat of the municipality is the village Vourgareli. The municipality has an area of 509.231 km2. The municipality is named after the Tzoumerka mountains.

Municipality
The municipality Central Tzoumerka was formed at the 2011 local government reform by the merger of the following 4 former municipalities, that became municipal units:
Agnanta
Athamania
Melissourgoi
Theodoriana

References

Populated places in Arta (regional unit)
Municipalities of Epirus (region)